General Petrov may refer to:

Ivan Yefimovich Petrov (1896–1958), Soviet Army general
Mikhail Petrovich Petrov (general) (1898–1941), Soviet Army major general
Racho Petrov (1861–1942), Bulgarian Army general of the infantry
Vasily Petrov (general) (1922–2003), Soviet Army colonel general